Johan Brun (19 October 1922 – 27 April 2021) was a Norwegian photographer.

Personal life
Brun was born in Uvdal on 19 October 1922, a son of farmer Henrik Natvig Brun and schoolteacher Brita Bøckmann. In 1954 he married Ingrid Eliassen (born 1931).

Career
Brun worked as photographer for the newspaper Dagbladet from 1948. He became known for his sports pictures, and later, nature pictures. His books include Kapp til Kapp (with Richard Papes; 1956) and Vassfaret (1969; with Per Hohle), and he illustrated a series of historical books by Vera Henriksen.

Selected works

References

1922 births
2021 deaths
People from Nore og Uvdal
Norwegian photographers
Dagbladet people
Sports photographers